Troy Smith (born 11 April 1987) is a Jamaican international footballer who plays for Montego Bay United, as a defender.

Career
Smith began his career with Village United, before moving to Montego Bay United in 2012.

He made his international debut for Jamaica in 2010.

References

1987 births
Living people
Jamaican footballers
Jamaica international footballers
Association football defenders
Montego Bay United F.C. players
Pan American Games silver medalists for Jamaica
Pan American Games medalists in football
Medalists at the 2007 Pan American Games
Footballers at the 2007 Pan American Games